Cicuiara striata is a species of beetle in the family Cerambycidae. It was first described by Henry Walter Bates in 1866 as Exocentrus striatus. It is found in Brazil and Venezuela.

References

Desmiphorini
Beetles described in 1866